Numerous vessels have borne the name Talisman, including:

 , launched for the French navy at Le Havre in 1862 and also used as an oceanographical survey ship
 , built as American Civil War blockade runner
 , a Clyde paddle steamer that served the railway companies until 1934
 , a destroyer originally named HMS Talisman but renamed Louis while under construction
 , one of four s, taken over by the Royal Navy during the First World War
 DEPV Talisman, a Clyde paddle vessel that served the railway companies until 1967
 , a submarine commissioned in 1940 and sunk in 1942
 Talisman UUV, an autonomous unmanned mini-sub, launched in 2004
 Two steamboats Talisman associated with Abraham Lincoln and his home at New Salem, Illinois which were built in 1832 and 1961

See also

Ship names